Anžejs Pasečņiks (born 20 December 1995) is a Latvian professional basketball player for Real Betis of the Liga ACB.

Professional career

Europe
He made his professional debut in the Latvian League with VEF Rīga in 2012.

In August 2015, Pasečņiks signed with the Spanish club Herbalife Gran Canaria. He would play in its reserve team, club of the Liga EBA, fourth division.

He debuted with the ACB team in the Supercopa Endesa.

On November 9, 2021, he has signed with Real Betis of the Spanish Liga ACB.

On November 30, 2022, Anzejs signed with Metropolitans 92.

NBA
Pasečņiks was drafted by the Orlando Magic with the 25th overall pick in the first round of the 2017 NBA draft. He was immediately traded to the Philadelphia 76ers for future first-round and second-round picks.

On 1 July 2019, the Philadelphia 76ers renounced their draft right to Pasečņiks. On 3 July, Pasečņiks joined the Washington Wizards summer league team. On 16 October, Pasečņiks was signed by the Wizards, but was waived three days later. On 27 October, Pasečņiks was included in the training camp roster of the Capital City Go-Go. On 17 December, the Wizards announced that they had signed Pasečņiks to a two-way contract. On 18 December, Pasečņiks made his debut in the NBA, coming off from bench with nine points, eight rebounds and an assist in a 110–109 overtime loss to the Chicago Bulls. On 12 January 2020, the Wizards announced that they had signed Pasečņiks to a multi-year contract. The Wizards waived Pasečņiks on 17 January 2021.

National team career
He was a regular Latvian youth national team player. He helped Latvia's U-18 national team reach semi-finals at the 2013 FIBA Europe Under-18 Championship, where he was named to the All-Tournament Team, averaging 12.6 points and 7.7 rebounds at the tournament.

Accomplishments and awards

Individual
 2013 FIBA Europe Under-18 Championship: All-Tournament Team
 European Under-18 All-Star Game MVP (2013)

Career statistics

NBA

Regular season

|-
| style="text-align:left;"|
| style="text-align:left;"|Washington
| 27 || 0 || 16.2 || .526 || .000 || .586 || 4.0 || .7 || .3 || .4 || 5.8
|-
| style="text-align:left;"|
| style="text-align:left;"|Washington
| 1 || 0 || 6.0 || .000 || .000 ||  || 1.0 || 1.0 || .0 || .0 || .0
|- class="sortbottom"
| style="text-align:center;" colspan="2"|Career
| 28 || 0 || 15.8 || .521 || .000 || .586 || 3.9 || .7 || .3 || .4 || 5.6

References

External links

 Anžejs Pasečņiks at eurobasket.com
 Anžejs Pasečņiks at DraftExpress.com
 Anžejs Pasečņiks at FIBAEurope.com
 Anžejs Pasečņiks at EurocupBasketball.com

1995 births
Living people
Basketball players from Riga
BK VEF Rīga players
Capital City Go-Go players
CB Gran Canaria players
Centers (basketball)
Latvian expatriate basketball people in Spain
Latvian expatriate basketball people in the United States
Latvian men's basketball players
Liga ACB players
Metropolitans 92 players
National Basketball Association players from Latvia
Orlando Magic draft picks
Real Betis Baloncesto players
Washington Wizards players